Tibor Cservenyák (born 8 August 1948, in Szolnok) is a Hungarian former water polo player who competed in the 1972 Summer Olympics and in the 1976 Summer Olympics.

Biography
From the age of ten he played water polo for Szolnoki Dózsa, from 1973 for Újpesti Dózsa, and then from 1983 for Volán Sports Club for two years. Between 1970 and 1984 he played 134 times in the Hungarian national team. He was a member of the 1976 Summer Olympics, and won the title of Olympic Champion for the Hungarian team in Montreal.

In 1975, he graduated at the Budapest University of Technology as a chemical engineer, and then was since 1976 water polo coach at the Semmelweis University. After this, he settled in Switzerland, where worked as a chemist. After his retirement, he was coach in Solothurn, Switzerland from 1984 to 1990 and then captain of the Switzerland men's national water polo team until 1992.

His daughter Viktória, now Countess of Bardi, is the wife of Prince Jaime, Count of Bardi.

See also
 Hungary men's Olympic water polo team records and statistics
 List of Olympic champions in men's water polo
 List of Olympic medalists in water polo (men)
 List of men's Olympic water polo tournament goalkeepers
 List of world champions in men's water polo
 List of World Aquatics Championships medalists in water polo

References

External links
 

1948 births
Living people
Hungarian male water polo players
Water polo goalkeepers
Olympic water polo players of Hungary
Water polo players at the 1972 Summer Olympics
Water polo players at the 1976 Summer Olympics
Olympic gold medalists for Hungary
Olympic silver medalists for Hungary
Olympic medalists in water polo
People from Szolnok
Medalists at the 1976 Summer Olympics
Medalists at the 1972 Summer Olympics
Sportspeople from Jász-Nagykun-Szolnok County
20th-century Hungarian people
21st-century Hungarian people
Tibor